Aleksei Alexeyevich Oleinik (born June 25, 1977, as Oleksíy Oleksíyovych Olíynyk) is a Russian mixed martial artist and combat sambo fighter who  fought for the Ultimate Fighting Championship, competing in their heavyweight division. He began his professional fighting career in 1997, and is a veteran of M-1 Global, ProFC and IAFC and has competed for Bellator, KSW and YAMMA Pit Fighting. He is the only fighter to win a UFC fight via Ezekiel choke, and has done so twice. Oleinik also holds the record for most Ezekiel choke wins in MMA competition, with fourteen.

Grappling career
During his training camp with K-Dojo Warrior Tribe in April 2011, Oleinik participated in two Grappling tournaments, he won the Absolute division in an Eddie Alvarez hosted grappling tournament, and also won the Men's black belt No-Gi Advanced Super weight (210 lbs and over) division in the Grapplers Quest "Beast of the East 2011" tournament.

Oleinik made his return to grappling in a superfight against multiple-time World Champion Gordon Ryan on December 12, 2019 at Quintet: Ultra. He lost the match quickly by kneebar.

Mixed martial arts career
Oleinik originally started MMA to prove himself to be strong. “I just wanted to prove to myself and others that I could be strong, to protect yourself and others. Then, it turned out that I do it very well, and became my profession.”

Oleinik represented Russia for the Imperial Team in the M-1 Challenge 2009 season, where he defeated Sang Soo Lee. Alexey has highly regarded submission grappling skills which he developed from his background in training in traditional Japanese jujutsu and competition in Combat Sambo. He fought Robin Gracie trained Spanish BJJ black belt Rogent Lloret in a fight that ended in a draw. After his loss to Chris Tuchscherer he went 12 fights without a loss. That streak came to a halt when he lost via TKO in the first round against Michal Kita at the ProFC Heavyweight Grand Prix 2009.

Bellator MMA
In the summer of 2010, under the tutelage of K-Dojo Head Coach Murat Keshtov, Oleinik participated in the inaugural heavyweight tournament for Bellator Fighting Championships. He faced Mike Hayes in the opening round and won the match via a split decision.

In his next bout, he was stopped in the semi-finals by Neil Grove. He lost via TKO, the referee stopped the fight at 0:45 of the opening round.

Ultimate Fighting Championship
In November 2013 Oleinik announced that he signed a contract with the UFC, and was expected to face Jared Rosholt on January 25, 2014, at UFC on Fox 10. However, Oleinik was forced out of the bout with an injury and Rosholt was pulled from the card altogether.

In his debut, Oleinik faced fellow newcomer Anthony Hamilton on June 28, 2014, at UFC Fight Night: Swanson vs. Stephens. He won the fight via scarf hold headlock submission early in the first round.

The rescheduled bout with Jared Rosholt took place on November 22, 2014, at UFC Fight Night 57. Oleinik won the fight via knockout in the first round. The win also earned Oleinik his first Performance of the Night bonus award.

In an interview on September 9, 2015, Oleinik indicated that he had been sidelined by multiple knee surgeries and subsequent rehabilitation. Oleinik said he has no intention of retiring and expects a possible return sometime in the middle of 2016.

Oleinik next faced Daniel Omielańczuk on July 13, 2016, at UFC Fight Night 91. He lost the fight via majority decision.

Oleinik next faced Viktor Pešta on January 15, 2017, at UFC Fight Night 103. He won the fight in the first round via Ezekiel choke, the first in UFC history and was awarded a Performance of the Night bonus. In unbelievable circumstances, it was executed while in Pešta's "full mount" position, where it is very rarely seen executed without the usage of a 'gi. However, the Ezekiel choke technique was not new to Oleinik, who had already won 12 fights by the same submission earlier in his career.

Oleinik faced Travis Browne on July 8, 2017, at UFC 213. He dropped Browne with a right hook in the first round and showed his superior grappling when he won the fight via submission, due to a rear-naked choke (with a modified grip and without a complete full back mount) in the second round.

Oleinik faced Curtis Blaydes on November 4, 2017, at UFC 217. The referee stopped the fight in the second round after Blaydes delivered an illegal kick to a downed opponent and called a doctor to check on Oleinik. The fight was stopped due to the doctor's advice. The replay, however, showed the strike did not deliver significant damage (as it only grazed the ear), and the fight was ruled a TKO win for Blaydes.

Oleinik faced Júnior Albini on May 12, 2018, at UFC 224. He won the fight in the first round via Ezekiel choke, marking his second win via this rare choke in the UFC.
This win earned him the Performance of the Night award.

Oleinik was briefly linked to a bout with Fabrício Werdum on September 15, 2018, at UFC Fight Night 136. However, on May 22, Werdum was flagged for a potential USADA doping violation, and was later suspended for 2 years. Oleinik instead faced Mark Hunt on the card. He won the fight via rear-naked choke submission in the first round. This marked Oleinik's 45th submission win in his MMA career. This win earned him the Performance of the Night award.

Oleinik was expected to face Walt Harris on May 4, 2019, at UFC Fight Night 150. On April 3, 2019 news surfaced that he was withdrawn from the bout in order to headline UFC Fight Night: Volkov vs. Overeem against Alistair Overeem after Alexander Volkov had to withdraw.

Oleinik faced Alistair Overeem on 20 April 2019 at UFC Fight Night 149, replacing Alexander Volkov. He lost the fight via technical knockout in round one.

The bout between Oleinik and Walt Harris rescheduled for July 20, 2019, at UFC on ESPN 4. He lost the fight via knockout in the first round.

Oleinik faced Maurice Greene on January 18, 2020, at UFC 246. He won the fight via a submission in the second round. This win earned him a Performance of the Night award. As a result, Oleinik became the first in history both to compete and secure a victory in an MMA fight across four different decades (1990s, 2000s, 2010s, 2020s).

Oleinik was scheduled to face Fabrício Werdum on May 9, 2020, at UFC 250. However, on April 9, Dana White, the president of UFC announced that this event was postponed and the bout eventually took place on May 9, 2020 at UFC 249. Oleinik won the fight by split decision.

When he announced he was taking another fight, Oleinik "received a message in a bottle" on the beach of Miami, signed his contract, and sent it back to Dana White and Mick Maynard. When asked if Oleinik planned on retiring any time soon, he jokingly responded that he has "only 10 years left." Ahead of his fight with Lewis, Oleinik parted ways with his long-time management company representatives, First Round Management. He stated that he wanted a manager that would focus on all fighters, not just the top two or three fighters in their stable.

Oleinik faced Derrick Lewis on August 8, 2020, at UFC Fight Night 174. He lost the fight via technical knockout in round two.

Oleinik faced Chris Daukaus on February 20, 2021, at UFC Fight Night: Blaydes vs. Lewis. He lost the fight via technical knockout in round one.

Oleinik faced Sergey Spivak on June 19, 2021, at UFC on ESPN 25. He lost the bout via unanimous decision.

Oleinik was scheduled to face Greg Hardy on January 22, 2022, at UFC 270. However, Oleinik withdrew from the event for undisclosed reasons and he was replaced by Sergey Spivak.

Oleinik was scheduled to face Ilir Latifi on March 26, 2022, at UFC Fight Night 205. However, the day of the event, Latifi withdrew due to illness and the bout was cancelled. The pair was rescheduled to meet on two weeks later at UFC 273 on April 9, 2022. In turn, Latifi withdrew again for unknown reasons and was replaced by Jared Vanderaa. He won the bout via scarf hold submission in the first round. The win also earned him the Performance of the Night award. 

The match with Ilir Latifi was yet to rescheduled again for UFC Fight Night 211 on October 1, 2022. Oleinik lost the bout via unanimous decision.

On October 10, 2022, it was announced that Oleinik was released from UFC after completing his contract.

Personal life
Oleinik is married and has 5 children between the ages of 5 and 19. He and his family moved to Florida in December 2016. The eldest, Polina, attends Stoneman Douglas High School, and was present at the school during the mass shooting but was unharmed.

He is a naturalised Russian citizen, and expressed support towards Russia following its 2014 military intervention in Ukraine. He wore a shirt with Putin's face and as a result was denied entry into Ukraine.

Championships and accomplishments

Mixed martial arts
 Ultimate Fighting Championship
 Performance of the Night (Six times) 
 First fighter in UFC history to finish with an Ezekiel choke.
 Only fighter in UFC history to finish with an Ezekiel choke (now twice).
 Second most submission wins in heavyweight division (Seven)
 Konfrontacja Sztuk Walki
 2007 KSW 8 Heavyweight Tournament Winner
 M-1 Global
 2004 Middleweight Russia Cup Tournament Winner
 ProFC
 2008 ProFC 4 President's Cup Heavyweight Tournament Winner
 2008 ProFC 3 Heavyweight Grand Prix Runner-Up
 International Absolute Fighting Council
 2006 Russia Cup Light heavyweight Tournament Winner
 2009 Mayor's Cup Heavyweight Tournament Winner
 Perm Region MMA Federation
 2007 Professional MMA Cup Heavyweight Tournament Winner
 Other tournaments
 2007 Yaroslavl Open Championship Heavyweight Tournament Winner
 1996 Minamoto Cup Heavyweight Tournament Winner
  World Cup of Mixed Martial Arts
 WCMMA Heavyweight Championship (One time; first; last)
 MMA Mania
 2017 Submission of the Year (Top 5: #2)  vs. Viktor Pešta
 MMA Weekly
 2018 Submission of the Year vs. Júnior Albini

Combat sambo
 World Combat Sambo Federation
 World Combat Sambo Champion (2005)
 Eurasian Combat Sambo Champion (2001)
 Combat Sambo Federation of Russia
 Russian Combat Sambo Champion (2003, 2004)
 Moscow Combat Sambo Champion (Five time)

Submission grappling
 Grapplers Quest
 2011 Black belt No-Gi Advanced Superweight (210 lbs ) Tournament Winner
 Eddie Alvarez Grappling Tournament
 2011 Absolute Division Tournament Winner

Records
First fighter to compete across four different decades (1990s, 2000s, 2010s, 2020s)
First fighter to secure a victory across four different decades (1990s, 2000s, 2010s, 2020s)

Mixed martial arts record

|-
|Loss
|align=center|60–17–1
|Ilir Latifi
|Decision (unanimous)
|UFC Fight Night: Dern vs. Yan
|
|align=center|3
|align=center|5:00
|Las Vegas, Nevada, United States
|
|-
|Win
|align=center|60–16–1
|Jared Vanderaa
|Submission (scarf hold)
|UFC 273
|
|align=center|1
|align=center|3:39
|Jacksonville, Florida, United States
|
|-
|Loss
|align=center|59–16–1
|Sergey Spivak
|Decision (unanimous)
|UFC on ESPN: The Korean Zombie vs. Ige 
|
|align=center|3
|align=center|5:00
|Las Vegas, Nevada, United States
|
|-
|Loss
|align=center|59–15–1
|Chris Daukaus
|TKO (punches)
|UFC Fight Night: Blaydes vs. Lewis
|
|align=center|1
|align=center|1:55
|Las Vegas, Nevada, United States
|
|-
|Loss
|align=center|59–14–1
|Derrick Lewis
|TKO (punches)
|UFC Fight Night: Lewis vs. Oleinik
|
|align=center|2
|align=center|0:21
|Las Vegas, Nevada, United States
|
|-
| Win
|align=center|59–13–1
|Fabrício Werdum
|Decision (split)
|UFC 249
|
|align=center|3
|align=center|5:00
|Jacksonville, Florida, United States
|
|-
|Win
|align=center|58–13–1
|Maurice Greene
|Submission (armbar)
|UFC 246
|
|align=center|2
|align=center|4:38
|Las Vegas, Nevada, United States
|
|-
|Loss
|align=center|57–13–1
|Walt Harris
|KO (knee and punches)
|UFC on ESPN: dos Anjos vs. Edwards
|
|align=center|1
|align=center|0:12
|San Antonio, Texas, United States
|
|-
|Loss
|align=center|57–12–1
|Alistair Overeem
|TKO (punches)
|UFC Fight Night: Overeem vs. Oleinik
|
|align=center|1
|align=center|4:45
|Saint Petersburg, Russia
|
|-
|Win
|align=center|57–11–1
|Mark Hunt
|Submission (rear-naked choke)
|UFC Fight Night: Hunt vs. Oleinik
|
|align=center|1
|align=center|4:26
|Moscow, Russia
|
|-
|Win
|align=center|56–11–1
|Júnior Albini
|Submission (ezekiel choke)
|UFC 224
|
|align=center|1
|align=center|1:45
|Rio de Janeiro, Brazil
|
|-
|Loss
|align=center|55–11–1
|Curtis Blaydes
|TKO (doctor stoppage)
|UFC 217
|
|align=center|2
|align=center|1:56
|New York City, New York, United States
|
|-
|Win
| align=center|55–10–1
| Travis Browne
| Submission (neck crank)
| UFC 213
| 
| align=center|2
| align=center|3:44
| Las Vegas, Nevada, United States
|
|-
| Win
| align=center|54–10–1
| Viktor Pešta
| Submission (ezekiel choke)
| UFC Fight Night: Rodríguez vs. Penn
| 
| align=center|1
| align=center|2:57
| Phoenix, Arizona, United States
| 
|-
| Loss
| align=center|
| Daniel Omielańczuk
| Decision (majority)
| UFC Fight Night: McDonald vs. Lineker
| 
| align=center|3
| align=center|5:00
| Sioux Falls, South Dakota, United States
| 
|-
| Win
| align=center| 
| Jared Rosholt
| KO (punches)
| UFC Fight Night: Edgar vs. Swanson
| 
| align=center|1
| align=center| 3:21
| Austin, Texas, United States
| 
|-
| Win
| align=center| 52–9–1
| Anthony Hamilton
| Submission (scarf hold)
| UFC Fight Night: Swanson vs. Stephens
| 
| align=center| 1
| align=center| 2:18
| San Antonio, Texas, United States
| 
|-
| Win
| align=center| 51–9–1
| Mirko Cro Cop
| Submission (scarf hold)
| Legend Fight Show 2
| 
| align=center| 1
| align=center| 4:42
| Moscow, Russia
|
|-
| Win
| align=center| 50–9–1
| Dion Staring
| Submission (arm-triangle choke)
| ProFC 50
| 
| align=center| 1
| align=center| 1:41
| Rostov, Russia
| 
|-
| Win
| align=center| 49–9–1
| Jeff Monson
| Submission (rear-naked choke)
| Oplot Challenge 54
| 
| align=center| 2
| align=center| 2:12
| Kharkiv, Ukraine
| 
|-
| Win
| align=center| 48–9–1
| Tony Lopez
| Submission (triangle choke)
| Oplot Challenge 53
| 
| align=center| 3
| align=center| 3:19
| Kharkiv, Ukraine
| 
|-
| Win
| align=center| 47–9–1
| Leo Pla
| TKO (punches)
| Oplot Challenge 43
| 
| align=center| 1
| align=center| 2:56
| Kharkiv, Ukraine
| 
|-
| Win
| align=center| 46–9–1
| Martin Hudey
| Submission (rear-naked choke)
| Oplot Challenge 12
| 
| align=center| 1
| align=center| 1:48
| Kharkiv, Ukraine
| 
|-
| Win
| align=center| 45–9–1
| Mike Stewart
| Submission (ezekiel choke)
| WCMMA 1
| 
| align=center| 2
| align=center| 1:03
| Ledyard, Connecticut, United States
| 
|-
| Win
| align=center| 44–9–1
| Jerry Otto
| Submission (ezekiel choke)
| SK Oplot 2
| 
| align=center| 1
| align=center| 2:20
| Kharkiv, Ukraine
| 
|-
| Win
| align=center| 43–9–1
| Sergey Terezinov
| Submission (armbar)
| SK Oplot 1
| 
| align=center| 1
| align=center| 1:05
| Moscow, Russia
| 
|-
| Loss
| align=center| 42–9–1
| Jeff Monson
| Decision (split)
| M-1 Challenge 31
| 
| align=center| 3
| align=center| 5:00
| Moscow, Russia
| 
|-
| Loss
| align=center| 42–8–1
| Magomed Malikov
| TKO (punches)
| Fight Star
| 
| align=center| 1
| align=center| 2:39
| Anapa, Russia
| 
|-
| Win
| align=center| 42–7–1
| Ernest Kostanyan
| Submission (rear-naked choke)
| Razdolie Cup
| 
| align=center| 1
| align=center| 1:22
| Moscow, Russia
| 
|-
| Loss
| align=center| 41–7–1
| Neil Grove
| TKO (punches)
| Bellator 29
| 
| align=center| 1
| align=center| 0:45
| Milwaukee, Wisconsin, United States
| 
|-
| Win
| align=center| 41–6–1
| Mike Hayes
| Decision (split)
| Bellator 26
| 
| align=center| 3
| align=center| 5:00
| Kansas City, Missouri, United States
| 
|-
| Loss
| align=center| 40–6–1
| Michał Kita
| TKO (punches)
| rowspan="3"|IAFC: Mayor's Cup 2009
| rowspan="3"|
| align=center| 1
| align=center| 1:17
| rowspan="3"|Saint Petersburg, Russia
| 
|-
| Win
| align=center| 40–5–1
| Thiago dos Santos
| Submission (ezekiel choke)
| align=center| 1
| align=center| 4:22
| 
|-
| Win
| align=center| 39–5–1
| Eddy Bengtsson
| TKO (submission to punches)
| align=center| 2
| align=center| 1:55
| 
|-
| Draw
| align=center| 38–5–1
| Rogent Lloret
| Draw (unanimous)
| M-1 Global: Breakthrough
| 
| align=center| 3
| align=center| 5:00
| Kansas City, Missouri, United States
| 
|-
| Win
| align=center| 38–5
| Lee Sang-Soo
| Submission (ezekiel choke)
| M-1 Challenge 12: USA
| 
| align=center| 2
| align=center| 4:27
| Tacoma, Washington, United States
| 
|-
| Win
| align=center| 37–5
| Jessie Gibbs
| Submission (ezekiel choke)
| M-1 Challenge 11: 2009 Challenge Finals
| 
| align=center| 2
| align=center| 3:42
| Amstelveen, Netherlands
| 
|-
| Win
| align=center| 36–5
| Islam Dadalov
| TKO (punches)
| rowspan="2"|ProFC 4: President's Cup
| rowspan="2"|
| align=center| 1
| align=center| 2:33
| rowspan="2"|Grozny, Russia
| 
|-
| Win
| align=center| 35–5
| Abdülhalik Magomedov
| Submission (heel hook)
| align=center| 1
| align=center| 0:48
| 
|-
| Win
| align=center| 34–5
| Telman Sherifov
| Submission (guillotine choke)
| rowspan="3"|ProFC 3: Heavyweight Grand Prix
| rowspan="3"|
| align=center| 1
| align=center| 1:25
| rowspan="3"|Saint Petersburg, Russia
| 
|-
| Win
| align=center| 33–5
| Oleg Kutepov
| Submission (inverted armbar)
| align=center| 1
| align=center| 1:21
| 
|-
| Win
| align=center| 32–5
| Magomedbag Agaev
| Submission (scarf hold)
| align=center| 1
| align=center| 3:47
| 
|-
| Loss
| align=center| 31–5
| Konstantyn Stryzhak
| TKO (punches)
| rowspan="2"|CSFU: Champions League
| rowspan="2"|
| align=center| 1
| align=center| 4:20
| rowspan="2"|Poltava, Ukraine
| 
|-
| Win
| align=center| 31–4
| Makasharip Makasharipov
| Decision (unanimous)
| align=center| 3
| align=center| 5:00
| 
|-
| Win
| align=center| 30–4
| Alexander Timonov
| Submission (ezekiel choke)
| M-1 Challenge 4: Battle on the Neva 2
| 
| align=center| 1
| align=center| 1:09
| Saint Petersburg, Russia
| 
|-
| Win
| align=center| 29–4
| Daniel Dowda
| Decision (unanimous)
| KSW 9
| 
| align=center| 2
| align=center| 5:00
| Warsaw, Poland
|
|-
| Loss
| align=center| 28–4
| Chris Tuchscherer
| Decision (unanimous)
| rowspan="2"|YAMMA Pit Fighting
| rowspan="2"|
| align=center| 1
| align=center| 5:00
| rowspan="2"|Atlantic City, New Jersey, United States
| 
|-
| Win
| align=center| 28–3
| Sherman Pendergarst
| Submission (ezekiel choke)
| align=center| 1
| align=center| 4:18
| 
|-
| Win
| align=center| 27–3
| Gela Getsadze
| TKO (punches)
| rowspan="3"|Yaroslavl Open Championship 2007
| rowspan="3"|
| align=center| 1
| align=center| 1:48
| rowspan="3"|Yaroslavl, Russia
| 
|-
| Win
| align=center| 26–3
| Ishkhan Zakharian
| Submission (armbar)
| align=center| 1
| align=center| 2:56
| 
|-
| Win
| align=center| 25–3
| Andrey Oleinik
| Submission (heel hook)
| align=center| 1
| align=center| 1:30
| 
|-
| Win
| align=center| 24–3
| Timur Gasanov
| Submission (ezekiel choke)
| rowspan="3"|Perm Region MMA Federation: Cup of Professional MMA
| rowspan="3"|
| align=center| 1
| align=center| 1:19
| rowspan="3"|Perm, Russia
| 
|-
| Win
| align=center| 23–3
| Alavutdin Gadzhiyev
| Submission (ezekiel choke)
| align=center| 1
| align=center| 0:46
| 
|-
| Win
| align=center| 22–3
| Adlan Amagov
| Submission (ezekiel choke)
| align=center| 1
| align=center| 1:00
| 
|-
| Win
| align=center| 21–3
| Krzysztof Kułak
| Submission (ezekiel choke)
| rowspan="3"|KSW 8
| rowspan="3"|
| align=center| 1
| align=center| 2:50
| rowspan="3"|Warsaw, Poland
| 
|-
| Win
| align=center| 20–3
| Karol Bedorf
| Submission (triangle choke)
| align=center| 1
| align=center| 1:03
| 
|-
| Win
| align=center| 19–3
| Łukasz Woś
| Submission (rear-naked choke)
| align=center| 1
| align=center| 0:50
| 
|-
| Win
| align=center| 18–3
| Shamil Nurmagomedov
| Submission (neck crank)
| Legion Fight 1
| 
| align=center| 1
| align=center| N/A
| Rostov-on-Don, Russia
| 
|-
| Loss
| align=center| 17–3
| Chael Sonnen
| Decision (unanimous)
| BodogFight
| 
| align=center| 3
| align=center| 5:00
| Vancouver, British Columbia, Canada
| 
|-
| Win
| align=center| 17–2
| Ishkhan Zakharian
| Submission (triangle choke)
| Legion Fight: Black Sea Cup
| 
| align=center| 1
| align=center| 1:21
| Anapa, Russia
| 
|-
| Win
| align=center| 16–2
| Vladimir Rudakov
| Submission (triangle choke)
| rowspan="3"|IAFC: Cup of Russia in Professional Pankration
| rowspan="3"|
| align=center| 1
| align=center| 2:41
| rowspan="3"|Novosibirsk, Russia
| 
|-
| Win
| align=center| 15–2
| Magomed Sultanakhmedov
| Submission (ezekiel choke)
| align=center| 1
| align=center| 0:35
| 
|-
| Win
| align=center| 14–2
| Shavkat Urakov
| Submission (rear-naked choke)
| align=center| 1
| align=center| 0:41
| 
|-
| Loss
| align=center| 13–2
| Flavio Luiz Moura
| Technical Submission (rear-naked choke)
| rowspan="2"|M-1: Middleweight Grand Prix
| rowspan="2"|
| align=center| 1
| align=center| 1:11
| rowspan="2"|Saint Petersburg, Russia
| 
|-
| Win
| align=center| 13–1
| Marcelo Alfaya
| Decision (unanimous)
| align=center| 2
| align=center| 5:00
| 
|-
| Win
| align=center| 12–1
| Azred Telkusheev
| Submission (heel hook)
| rowspan="3"|M-1 Middleweight Russia Cup
| rowspan="3"|
| align=center| 1
| align=center| 0:38
| rowspan="3"|Saint Petersburg, Russia
| 
|-
| Win
| align=center| 11–1
| Ubaidula Chopolaev
| Submission (rear-naked choke)
| align=center| 1
| align=center| 0:48
| 
|-
| Win
| align=center| 10–1
| Ramin Tagiev
| Submission (rear-naked choke)
| align=center| 1
| align=center| 2:03
| 
|-
| Win
| align=center| 9–1
| Igor Bondarenko
| Submission (rear-naked choke)
| rowspan="2"|Land of Peresvit
| rowspan="2"|
| align=center| 1
| align=center| 2:03
| rowspan="2"|Kyiv, Ukraine
| 
|-
| Win
| align=center| 8–1
| Gennadiy Matsigora
| Submission (triangle choke)
| align=center| 1
| align=center| 2:25
| 
|-
| Win
| align=center| 7–1
| Gennadiy Matsigora
| Submission (armbar)
| rowspan="2"|InterPride 1999
| rowspan="2"|
| align=center| 1
| align=center| 2:03
| rowspan="2"|Kharkiv, Ukraine
| 
|-
| Win
| align=center| 6–1
| Vladimir Malyshev
| TKO (punches)
| align=center| 1
| align=center| 2:30
| 
|-
| Win
| align=center| 5–1
| Clarence Thatch
| TKO (submission to punches)
| International Super Challenge 1998
| 
| align=center| 1
| align=center| 3:43
| Kyiv, Ukraine
| 
|-
| Loss
| align=center| 4–1
| Leonid Efremov
| Submission (rear-naked choke)
| rowspan="2"|IAFC: Absolute Fighting Championship 2
| rowspan="2"|
| align=center| 1
| align=center| 2:48
| rowspan="2"|Moscow, Russia
| 
|-
| Win
| align=center| 4–0
| Igor Akinin
| Submission (guillotine choke)
| align=center| 1
| align=center| N/A
| 
|-
| Win
| align=center| 3–0
| Artem Kondratko
| Submission (rear-naked choke)
| rowspan="3"|Minamoto Cup: Ukraine Open No Holds Barred Championship
| rowspan="3"|
| align=center| 1
| align=center| 4:09
| rowspan="3"|Kharkiv, Ukraine
| 
|-
| Win
| align=center| 2–0
| Sergey Zalikhvatko
| TKO (punches)
| align=center| 1
| align=center| 1:52
| 
|-
| Win
| align=center| 1–0
| Alexandr Kruglenko
| Submission (rear-naked choke)
| align=center| 1
| align=center| 3:06
|

See also
 List of male mixed martial artists

References

External links
 
 

1977 births
Living people
Sportspeople from Kharkiv
Russian male mixed martial artists
Ukrainian male mixed martial artists
Heavyweight mixed martial artists
Russian jujutsuka
Russian sambo practitioners
Russian practitioners of Brazilian jiu-jitsu
Ukrainian jujutsuka
Ukrainian sambo practitioners
Ukrainian practitioners of Brazilian jiu-jitsu
Mixed martial arts trainers
Mixed martial artists utilizing jujutsu
Mixed martial artists utilizing sambo
Mixed martial artists utilizing Brazilian jiu-jitsu
People awarded a black belt in Brazilian jiu-jitsu
Kharkiv Polytechnic Institute alumni
Ukrainian emigrants to Russia
Naturalised citizens of Russia
Ultimate Fighting Championship male fighters